Aïn Madhi is a town and commune in Laghouat Province, Algeria, and the seat of Aïn Madhi District. According to the 1998 census it has a population of 6,263.

Aïn Madhi is the birthplace of Ahmad al-Tijani, founder of the Tijaniyyah Sufi order and film director and politician Nadia Labidi.

References

Communes of Laghouat Province